Luang Nuea may refer to:

 Luang Nuea, Chiang Mai
 Luang Nuea, Lampang